Norman Nyagah (born September 15, 1950) is son of Jeremiah Nyagah and brother to former presidential candidate Joseph Nyagah. He is a former member of Kenyan parliament. He was also the chief whip in parliament and he has represented Gachoka Constituency (1997-2002) and formerly Kamukunji Constituency (2002-2007) for the National Rainbow Coalition (NARC) party. During the nominations of PNU for the elections of 2007, Nyagah lost to Simon Mbugua nominations and defected to a small party headed by Kalembe Ndile called T.I.P The Independent Party of Kenya

External links 
Eye on Kenyan Parliament

1950 births
Living people
Party of National Unity (Kenya) politicians
Members of the National Assembly (Kenya)
National Rainbow Coalition politicians